Abu al-Hasan 'Ali ibn Muhammad al-Bazdawi (c. 1010-1089 A.D.), known with the honorific title of Fakhr al-Islam (the pride of Islam), was a leading Hanafi scholar in the principles of Islamic jurisprudence. He is author of the acclaimed Kanz al-Wusul ila Ma'refat al-Usul, popularly known as Usul al-Bazdawi, a seminal work in Hanafi Usul al-Fiqh.

'Abd al-Qadir ibn Abi al-Wafa' al-Qurashi (d. 775/1373) has praised him in his Hanafi biographical dictionary, Al-Jawahir al-Mudiyya fi Tabaqat al-Hanafiyya.

Works
His most famous book is Kanz al-Wusul ila Ma'refat al-Usul, popularly known as Usul al-Bazdawi, which is a seminal book in Hanafi Usul al-Fiqh and was a standard teaching text for centuries.

In this work, he focuses on issues such as rules and methods of determining a variety of sources and methods for making the right decision and discourses on rules of working with texts, and so on. The Uzbek Academy of Sciences has more than a dozen copies of this work.

The book has generated numerous commentaries, the most popular of which being Kashf al-Asrar by 'Abd al-'Aziz al-Bukhari (d. 730/1329).

His other works include:
 Sharh al-Jami' al-Kabeer, and Sharh al-Jami' al-Sagheer (Commentaries on al-Jami' al-Kabeer, and al-Jami' al-Sagheer by Muhammad al-Shaybani).
 Sharh al-Jami' al-Sahih (Commentary on Sahih al-Bukhari).
 Al-Mabsut fi Furu' al-Fiqh (An Extensive Book on Branches of Fiqh).
 Kitab al-Muyassar fi al-Kalam (Elementary Hand-book for Dialectical Theology), a manuscript of which still survives.
He also wrote on Tafsir (Qur'anic exegesis).

Teachers
Al-Bazdawi studied under Shams al-A'imma 'Abd al-'Aziz al-Halwani (d. 456/1064) who was also a teacher to Al-Sarakhsi.

Students
Sadr al-Islam Abu al-Yusr al-Bazdawi (his younger brother)
Najm al-Din Abu Hafs Umar al-Nasafi

See also
 List of Hanafis
 List of Ash'aris and Maturidis

References

Maturidis
Hanafi fiqh scholars
11th-century Muslim theologians
Quranic exegesis scholars
Sunni Muslim scholars of Islam
Sunni imams
People from Samarkand
1010s births
1089 deaths